Charles Shelton (August 16, 1935 – February 13, 2020) was an American college football player and coach. He served as the head football coach at  Drake University from 1977 until 1985, at Utah State University from 1986 to 1992, and at University of the Pacific in Stockton, California from 1992 to 1995, compiling a career college football coaching record of 81–127–1.  He was the head coach at two schools, Drake and Pacific, when they canceled their football program. Drake brought it back for the 1987 school year, but Shelton had already left as head coach.  Shelton was born in Rolla, Missouri and led the state of Missouri in rushing in 1954. During the 1954 season he averaged more than 12 yards per carry, and led his team to an undefeated season.

Head coaching record

College

References

External links
 ArenaFan.com profile

1935 births
2020 deaths
American football halfbacks
Drake Bulldogs football coaches
Eastern New Mexico Greyhounds football coaches
Las Vegas Locomotives coaches
Pacific Tigers football coaches
Pittsburg State Gorillas football players
Toronto Phantoms coaches
Truman Bulldogs football coaches
Utah State Aggies football coaches
University of Cincinnati people
United Football League (2009–2012) executives
Wichita State Shockers football coaches
High school football coaches in Kansas
High school football coaches in Missouri
High school football coaches in Utah
Junior college football coaches in the United States
People from Rolla, Missouri
Players of American football from Missouri